Muirhouses is a small village which lies in the Falkirk council area of Scotland. Muirhouses sits near to the south bank of the Firth of Forth close to the council boundary line between Falkirk and West Lothian councils.

Access to the village can be gained from the south by the A993 road and from the north by the A904 road. At the time of the 2001 census the village had a population of 235 residents.

See also
Carriden House

References

External links

Canmore - Muirhouses Roman Camp site record

Villages in Falkirk (council area)